The Sony Ericsson W902 is a mobile phone and part of the Walkman series of phones. It was announced in July 2008 (alongside the W302 and W595) and released in October 2008. The W902 is a higher end Walkman phone, featuring not only the latest state of the art Walkman 3.0 player, but also a 5.0 mega pixel camera with autofocus and flash, similar to that of many Cyber-Shot range phones, leading to some nicknaming this model 'Cyber-Walkman-Shot'.

The W902 also features a series of buttons down the side so that control of music is easily accessible. Auto-rotate means that the media player will switch to landscape mode if the phone is held on its side. This also applies to the web browser. The W902 also features shake control, meaning the music can be changed with 'the flick of a wrist', as can the volume of the music.

As of early 2009, the W902 has not been well publicised, and as such, there are fewer of them around, meaning they have maintained their value exceptionally well.

References

External links
 Official webpage

W902
Mobile phones introduced in 2008